Behind The Player: Robbie Merrill is an interactive music video featuring Godsmack bassist Robbie Merrill. Released on November 1, 2008 by IMV, the DVD features Robbie giving in-depth bass lessons for how to play "Speak" and "Voodoo" by Godsmack and an intimate behind-the scenes look at his life as a professional musician, including rare photos and video.  The DVD also includes Robbie jamming the two tracks with Godsmack drummer Shannon Larkin, VideoTab that shows exactly how Robbie plays his parts in the two songs, as well as other bonus material.

IMV donates $.25 from the sale of each Behind the Player DVD to Little Kids Rock, an organization that gets instruments in the hands of underprivileged kids.

Contents
Behind The Player
Robbie talks about his background, influences and gear, including rare photos and video

"Speak" by Godsmack
Lesson: Robbie gives an in-depth bass lesson for how to play the song
Jam: Robbie jams the track with Godsmack drummer Shannon Larkin
VideoTab: Animated tablature shows exactly how Robbie plays the track

"Voodoo" by Godsmack
Lesson: Robbie gives an in-depth bass lesson for how to play the song
Jam: Robbie jams the track with Godsmack drummer Shannon Larkin
VideoTab: Animated tablature shows exactly how Robbie plays the track

Special features
Godsmack: Live trailer
Little Kids Rock promotional video

Personnel

Produced By: Ken Mayer & Sean E Demott
Directed By: Leon Melas
Executive Producer: Rick Donaleshen
Associate Producer: Shane Hall
Director Of Photography: Ken Barrows
Sound Engineer: Tim Harkins
Edited By: Jeff Morose
Mixed By: Matt Chidgey & Cedrick Courtois
Graphics By: Thayer Demay
Transcription By: Thayer Demay
Camera Operators: Chris Shaw, Mike Chateneuf, Kieth Mcnulty, Doug Cragoe
Gaffer: John Parker

Technical Director: Tyler Bourns
Assistant Director: Matt Pick
Production Assistant: Laine Proctor
Lighting And Grip: Mcnulty Nielson
Artist Hospitality: Sasha Mayer
Shot At: Korn Studios
Special Guest: Shannon Larkin
Cover Photo By: Neil Zlozower
Video Courtesy Of: Oz Barron, Universal Records
Photos Courtesy Of: Neil Zlozower, Joes Testa, Spector Bass, Shane Hall, Stephanie Pick

External links
Official website

Behind the Player